André Byrame (born 10 November 1943 in Goyave, Guadeloupe) is a French athlete who specialised in the 100 metres. Byrame competed at the 1972 Summer Olympics.

References

External links
 

French male sprinters
Olympic athletes of France
French people of Guadeloupean descent
Living people
Athletes (track and field) at the 1972 Summer Olympics
1943 births
20th-century French people